State Highway 8 (SH 8) is an  long state highway in the U.S. state of Colorado. SH 8's western terminus is at U.S. Route 285 (US 285) in Morrison, and the eastern terminus is at SH 121 in Lakewood.

Route description

From its western terminus at the interchange with the U.S. Highway 285 freeway, SH 8 runs north in the town of Morrison, then east on Morrison Road to its eastern terminus at State Highway 121, also known as Wadsworth Boulevard, in Lakewood.  The entire length of this highway is a little less than nine miles (14 km), all within the western suburbs of Denver and entirely within Jefferson County.  No part of SH 8 is a freeway.

Within the town of Morrison is a road junction with State Highway 74, also known as Bear Creek Canyon Road, westbound to Evergreen.  East of Morrison is an interchange with the SH 470 freeway. East of SH 470 and west of Wadsworth Boulevard is an intersection with State Highway 391 (South Kipling Parkway).

Major intersections

References

Extenal links

008
State Highway 008
State Highway 008